Rhee Woo Seok, also credited as Rainstone, is a South Korean music producer, songwriter, and vice-president of JYP Entertainment in the United States. He is best known for composing and producing the Wonder Girls' 2009 international hit song, "Nobody."

Biography
From an early age, Woo S. Rhee/RAINSTONE had an ear for music as well as hitting number one. He was classically trained in piano, violin, and viola and in high school, he expanded his wings and started a Rock Band called "Feel." In 1993, as a junior in High School, Woo S. Rhee/RAINSTONE and his band mates entered a college only rock festival, Korean Rock Group Festival and won first place. Although, there were many issues regarding their win because of their age, Woo S. Rhee/RAINSTONE and his band proved that talent is more important than experience.

But as Woo S. Rhee/RAINSTONE started to mature as a musician, he started to embrace Jazz and began taking private classes behind his band mates. This opened his eyes and ears to a new world of music as well as coming across Stevie Wonder and discovering urban music. He realized with his new burning passion, Korea was very limited and decided to study in America.

In 1999, he received his Bachelor's from Berklee College of Music majoring in Professional Music, concentrating on composition and arrangements. After his undergrad, he received his Masters in Media writing and Production from University of Miami in 2003.

Music career
Upon completion of his master's degree in music engineering in 2003, Woo S. Rhee/RAINSTONE took his talents to New York City, where he met international music producer extraordinaire Park Jin-Young also known as J.Y. Park.

Together this formidable duo collaborated in extensive pieces, producing and co-producing for artists such as G.O.D and Rain. But they are most notable from the success of Wonder Girls "Tell Me" and "Nobody".

The song "Tell Me" was the lead single from the Wonder Girls' first full-length album, Nobody (Wonder Girls song)The Wonder Years, which was created in Woo S. Rhee/RAINSTONE's basement studio in Jersey with J.Y. Park. It immediately hit #1 on various charts and received #1 on KBS's music TV series, staying at that position for 7 consecutive weeks. The song received a triple crown at SBS Inkigayo and won Cyworld Digital Music Awards: Song of the Month (October) ("Tell Me")[5] and 5th Korean Music Awards: Best Dance & Electronic Song Award ("Tell Me")[6]. "Tell Me" is notable for its choreography, which was widely imitated and featured on various online video sites.[1] This phenomenon started the 'Girl Group Syndrome,' being the first movement for Girl Groups in the K-POP Scene. In 2013, Online Research Panel Korea ran a survey from June 26 to the 30th asking voters to pick the song they felt is the best idol song. After 21,955 votes were counted, Wonder Girls' "Tell Me" topped the list with 27% (5866 votes).

Their second major hit, "Nobody", sold 4,648,973 digital downloads in South Korea alone, Most YouTube video viewed in 2011, and the first Asian song #1 in 8 Different Asian Countries. At the 2008 MNet KM Music Festival Awards, the Wonder Girls received three awards: the "Song of the Year" award, "Best Music Video" for "Nobody" and "Best Female Group".[20] The group also won an award at the 2008 Golden Disk Awards a month later for high digital sales.[21] At the 18th Seoul Music Awards, the Wonder Girls won the Daesang ("Artist of the Year" award), the highest award offered, for "Nobody", and two other awards.[22]

With the hit singles like "Tell Me" and "Nobody" garnering huge International success, and creating a YouTube phenomenon with people from all walks of life copying their dance moves and catchy tunes; it cemented Woo S. Rhee/RAINSTONE’s reputation in Asia as a highly sought after talent that brings a big and new sound to the cache of JYP Entertainment’s music production team.

In 2012, Woo S. Rhee/RAINSTONE produced Wonder Girls "Like money" featuring superstar Akon and collaborating with Samsung in their music video. This was the first official U.S Single and in its first week of release the song debuted at number 11 in South Korea with 161,542 downloads. By the end of August 2012 the song was downloaded 583,737 times in South Korea alone, making the song one of the best-selling English-language songs of the year in Korea and as well as ranking #46 on top charts.

Woo S. Rhee/RAINSTONE also had a chance to work with his beloved mentor Stevie Wonder and produced Wonder Girls "Wonder Love" released in Japan.

Not only has Woo S. Rhee/RAINSTONE generated non-stop hits for the Wonder Girls but also took major parts in the careers of all his JYP Artist such as Rain, 2PM, 2AM, Miss A, and 15& and much more. For example, 2PM's "Heartbeat" was released as the lead single for The First Album 01:59PM peaking at No. 1 on the Gaon Chart.

Currently, Woo S. Rhee/RAINSTONE collaborated with China's biggest game and IT company QQ Games with 2PM. He produced 2PM's game theme song "Shining in the Night," official launch date on 4/18/13 in Beijing

Business career
With Woo Rhee’s new sound and business acumen, and JY Park’s dynamic company backing them up, they formed JYP Entertainment USA in 2007, an offshoot of the larger company in Korea, JYP Entertainment.

Among Woo Rhee’s better known attributes is his affinity to finding creative ways to do more than just produce music, but to create brand exposure and power from it. Together, Woo Rhee and JY Park helped design, create, and brand what is now one of the world’s best-selling headphones, the Diamond Tears.  This headphone is a joint venture between Monster and JYP USA.  To this date, the headphones are one of the most highly sought-after headphones in the market as well as one of the highest-rated.

Woo Rhee is also invited to 2013 Dubai International Awards in November as a representative of Asia.

Production credits

Source: Korea Music Copyright Association, ID: W0438700.

References

External links
Rainstone on JYP Publishing

Living people
South Korean songwriters
South Korean producers
Year of birth missing (living people)